Black Atlantans are residents of the city Atlanta who are of African American ancestry. Atlanta has long been known as a center of black wealth, higher education, political power and culture; a cradle of the Civil Rights Movement.

Demographics
The 2010 and 2000 black population of the city of Atlanta was:

From 2000 to 2010 Atlanta saw significant shifts in the racial composition of its neighborhoods. (See: Demographics of Atlanta: Race and ethnicity by neighborhood) There was a decrease in the black population in the following areas:
In NPU W (East Atlanta, Grant Park, Ormewood Park, Benteen Park), the black population went from 57.6% to 38.0%, and the white proportion rose from 36.5% to 54.8%
In NPU O (Edgewood, Kirkwood, East Lake area), the black population went from 86.2% to 58.7%, and the white proportion rose from 11.3% to 36.9%.
In NPU L (English Avenue, Vine City), the black proportion of the population went down from 97.5% to 89.1%, while the white proportion rose from 1.3% to 6.1%. Note that there many infill residential units were added in the King Plow Arts Center area, which falls under English Avenue but which in character is an extension of the Marietta Street Artery and West Midtown.
In NPU D, stretching from West Midtown along the border of Buckhead and northwestern Atlanta, westward towards the river, the white proportion rose from 49.3% to 59.2% with the black proportion dropping from 36.5% to 23.9%

While there was an increasing black population in these areas:
In NPU X (Metropolitan Parkway corridor), the black proportion of the population rose from 59.5% to 83.2%, while the White, Asian and Hispanic proportion dropped about three percentage points each.
NPU B (central Buckhead) became more diverse, with the white proportion dropping from 82.8% to 75.5%, the black proportion rising from 5.9% to 12.3%, and the Asian proportion from 3.1% to 5.3%

In Metro Atlanta, Black Americans are the largest racial minority at 32.4% of the population, up from 28.9% in 2000. From 2000 to 2010, the geographic distribution of blacks in Metro Atlanta changed significantly. Long concentrated in the city of Atlanta and DeKalb County, the black population there dropped while over half a million African Americans settled across other parts of the metro area, including approximately 112,000 in Gwinnett County, 71,000 in Fulton outside Atlanta, 58,000 in Cobb, 50,000 in Clayton, 34,000 in Douglas, and 27,000 each in Newton and Rockdale Counties.

According to a 2015 analysis of census data, Metro Atlanta had the greatest numerical gain in new black residents than any metropolitan area in the U.S. (Dallas–Fort Worth metroplex was second), with more than 198,031 black residents moving there.

There is a black Jamaican community in Atlanta. Jamaicans are concentrated in Stone Mountain, Decatur, Lithonia and Snellville. There is also a black Haitian community in Atlanta.

African-born blacks in Atlanta are mostly from Eritrea, Ethiopia, Ghana, Somalia, Liberia, and Nigeria.

Political power
In 1870, William Finch and George Graham became the first African Americans to be elected to the Atlanta Board of Aldermen (now the Atlanta City Council), and no other until the election of Q.V. Williamson to the Board in 1966. Since 1973, Atlanta has consistently elected black mayors, and two in particular have been prominent on the national stage, Andrew Young and Maynard Jackson. Jackson was elected with the support of the predominantly white business community, including the chairmen of Coca-Cola, Citizens & Southern National Bank, the Trust Company of Georgia, and architect and Peachtree Center developer John Portman. They were hopeful that a new progressive coalition would be forged between downtown and City Hall; but they were not prepared for the level of support for the goals of the black community that the mayor provided through support for minority-based businesses and for neighborhood-based organizations.

Since then, there has been "a sometimes uneasy partnership between black political clout and white financial power that has helped Atlanta move closer to its goal of becoming a world-class city."

Higher education

Atlanta is home to the Atlanta University Center (AUC), the nation's oldest and largest contiguous consortium of historically-black colleges, comprising Clark Atlanta University, Morehouse College, Spelman College, Morehouse School of Medicine, and Interdenominational Theological Center. The first of these colleges were established shortly after the Civil War and have made Atlanta one of the historic centers of black intellectualism and empowerment.

Many of the nation's most accomplished African Americans matriculated through the AUC. See: Morehouse College alumni; Clark Atlanta University alumni; Spelman College alumnae

Morris Brown College is the first institution of higher learning in Georgia founded by African-Americans.

Atlanta Metropolitan State College is a predominately black institution.

Clayton State University (CSU) is a historically white public institution 15 miles south of Atlanta that has been predominately black since the mid-2000s. In 2021, CSU appointed its first black president.

Georgia Gwinnett College is a formerly predominately white public institution 30 miles northeast of Atlanta that has been mostly black since the late-2010s.

The Atlanta's John Marshall Law School is a historically white private law school that became Georgia's only mostly black law school in the mid-2010s.  In 2020, the law school hired its first black dean.

Emory University has one of the oldest African-American studies departments in the nation.  It began in 1971 and has expanded since its inception.

The Georgia Institute of Technology consistently ranks among the top five institutions in the nation to produce the most black engineers at the bachelor's, master's, and doctoral levels.

Georgia State University (GSU) is a historically white public institution that since the 2010s has been mostly black, with more black students than any other university in the nation.  GSU is the largest university in Georgia and leads the nation in producing the most black college graduates with bachelor's degrees annually. In 2021, GSU appointed its first black president.

Upper class

Atlanta has a well-organized black upper class which exerts its power in politics, business and academia, and historically, in the religious arena. Mayors Maynard Jackson and Andrew Young were representative of the upper, not working class, and rose to national standing. The black academic community is the largest of any US city's because of the presence of the Atlanta University Center (AUC), a consortium of six historically black colleges (HBCUs). In business, Atlanta is home to the nation's largest black-owned insurance company (Atlanta Life), real-estate development firm (H.J. Russell) as well as some of the country's top black-owned investment and law firms, car dealerships, and food service companies. An old-guard black elite, graduated from AUC schools and whose status dates back to the glory days of Sweet Auburn or before, guards its social circles from "new" black money—families such as Herndon, Yates, Bond, Milton, Yancey, Blayton, Rucker, Aikens, Harper, Cooper, Dobbs and Scott. The First Congregational Church is their church of choice.

The concentration of a black elite in Atlanta can be explained by:
 the early establishment of black colleges in the city immediately after the Civil War, producing graduates who remained in the city as leaders
 the high proportion of blacks in the general population (as compared to New York or Chicago), providing a large market for goods and services
 After the 1906 Atlanta Race Riot, blacks removed their businesses from downtown Atlanta to seek safety; during the same period, explicit segregationist legislation was introduced, which had the effect of producing a concentrated and dynamic separate black business community in the refuges of Sweet Auburn and the area around Ashby Street (now Rev. Dr. Joseph E. Lowery Boulevard).

In the 1920s, Hunter Street (now Martin Luther King Drive) and Collier Heights became the black elite neighborhoods of choice, while today areas in far southwest of the city around Camp Creek Marketplace, neighborhoods such as Niskey Lake, are also popular.  Upperclass Black Americans also reside in Eastern Atlanta in Dekalb County which is the second richest predominantly black county in the country.

Black mecca

A black mecca is a city to which African Americans, particularly professionals, are drawn to live, due to some or all of the following factors:

 superior economic opportunities for blacks, often as assessed by the presence of a large black upper-middle and upper class
 black political power in a city
 leading black educational institutions in a city
 a city's leading role in black arts, music, and other culture
 harmonious black-white race relations in a city

Atlanta has been referred to as a black mecca since the 1970s.

Culture and recreation
Atlanta is noted as the most prominent city for African-American culture, cuisine, nightlife, music, entertainment, film, history, and visual arts.  Some notables include the following:

The National Black Arts Festival has been based in Atlanta since the late 1980s.  Throughout the year, the festival features performing arts, literature and visual arts produced by creative artists of African descent.

The New Black Wall Street opened in 2021 is a 125,000-square-foot marketplace in Stonecrest that houses over 100 black merchants and entertainment. The marketplace is inspired by the popular black business district that was based in Tulsa, Oklahoma.

The Black Music & Entertainment Walk of Fame opened in 2021 near the Mercedes-Benz Stadium.

The Atlanta Jazz Festival in Piedmont Park is one of the largest free jazz festivals in the country and features mostly black artists. The annual event is hosted by the City of Atlanta Office of Cultural Affairs.

The A3C Festival & Conference is an annual fall event that mostly highlights African-American artists, creatives, innovators, activists, and entrepreneurs.

The One Musicfest is an annual summer Hip-Hop/R&B concert held in Atlanta.

House in the Park is a major house music festival held in Grant Park every Labor Day weekend.

The Castleberry Hill district (mainly Peter Street) has the largest concentration of black businesses and popular social spaces in the nation.

Edgewood Avenue (Old Fourth Ward/Downtown) has a notable concentration of black businesses and popular social spaces.

Atlanta's V-103 Winterfest is a Hip-Hop/R&B concert event held in State Farm Arena every December.

The Gathering Spot is a popular networking and social club composed of primarily millennial college-educated African-Americans.

Weekend brunch is a prominent aspect of black culture in the Atlanta area.  The area is home to many popular and vibrant black-owned brunch spots.

The Village at Ponce City Market is a marketplace that features black entrepreneurs.

The Sweet Auburn Springfest is an annual outdoor festival held in the historically black Sweet Auburn district.  It is one of the largest free outdoor festivals in the Southeastern United States.

504 Day in Atlanta is an annual event that celebrates New Orleans black culture.

The Sweet Auburn Music Festival is a large free outdoor black music event that place every fall in the historic Sweet Auburn district.

The Atlanta Hip Hop Day Festival is an annual event celebrating Atlanta's Hip-Hop artists and culture.

Afropunk Atlanta is a week-long fall festival that includes live music, film, fashion, and art produced by black artists.

The Atlanta Food Truck Park and Triton Yard are popular parks with mostly black-owned food trucks.

The Taste of Soul Atlanta is a four-day annual summer event that celebrates soul food and African-American culture.

Atlanta Black Restaurant Week is an annual event that highlights and celebrates the unique contributions of black-owned restaurants and black culinary professionals to the city's food scene.

The HBCU Alumni Alliance 5K Run/Walk is an annual summer fundraising event in Atlanta.

Atlanta Cigar Week is an annual social event that attracts primarily African-American cigar enthusiasts.

The Black Writers Weekend annual conference is based in Atlanta as of 2014.  The conference is the nation's only entertainment award show and gathering for black creatives in publishing, film and TV enthusiasts.

HBCU Summerfest is annual event celebrating and promoting unity amongst the nation's HBCUs.

The SWAC Alumni Picnic is an annual summer picnic that involves food and fellowship with alumni of SWAC schools living in Atlanta.

Be Out Day ATL is an annual weekend event for FAMU alumni, students, and prospective students living in the Atlanta area.  FAMU is consistently ranked the number one public HBCU in the nation and has a large alumni base in Atlanta.

The Atlanta Funkfest is an annual event soul and R&B concert held in the summer.

The Juneteenth Atlanta Parade & Music Festival is one of the largest annual Juneteenth events in the nation.

Atlanta has an abundance of black-centric street art and murals in many parts of the city.

The Cascade Skating Rink is a popular black-owned roller rink that was featured in the movie ATL (film) and is frequently patronized by black celebrities. Metro Fun Center and Skate Zone are other popular black-owned roller rinks in the area.

LudaDay Weekend is an annual event established by Ludacris and his foundation in 2005 that brings together the Atlanta community over Labor Day Weekend in dedication to social service and responsibility.

The UniverSoul Circus, the nation's only black owned and centric traveling circus, was founded and is based in Atlanta.

The Auburn Avenue Research Library on African American Culture and History opened in 1994 and is located in the Sweet Auburn Historic District.

There are several black owned and operated comedy clubs and productions in the Atlanta area.  Uptown Comedy Corner is one of the oldest black comedy clubs in the nation.

In 2009, The New York Times noted that after 2000, Atlanta moved "from the margins to becoming hip-hop's center of gravity, part of a larger shift in hip-hop innovation to the South." Producer Drumma Boy called Atlanta "the melting pot of the South". Producer Fatboi called the Roland TR-808 ("808") synthesizer "central" to Atlanta music's versatility, used for snap, crunk, trap, and pop rap styles. The same article named Drumma Boy, Fatboi, Shawty Redd and Zaytoven the four "hottest producers driving the city".

Atlanta is the setting for many movies and popular TV shows such as the Real Housewives of Atlanta, Tyler Perry's series, What Men Want, Atlanta, Being Mary Jane, and Star. Due to Perry, the Housewives, and others, Atlanta is known as the center of black entertainment in the U.S. Atlanta's status as the center of black entertainment was more solidified with the 2019 opening of an upgraded Tyler Perry Studios.  Tyler Perry Studios is one of the largest major film production studios in the nation and first owned outright by an African-American.

Black theater companies include True Colors, Jomandi Productions and Atlanta Black Theatre Festival.

The MEAC/SWAC Challenge is an annual historically black college football game showcasing a teams from the Mid-Eastern Athletic Conference (MEAC) and Southwestern Athletic Conference (SWAC).  The game moved to the Georgia State Stadium in 2018.

The Celebration Bowl is the only HBCU football bowl game in the nation.  The bowl game provides a match-up between the champions of the Mideastern Athletic Conference and the Southwestern Athletic Conference in the Mercedes-Benz Stadium.

The annual Black College Football Hall of Fame ceremony is held in Atlanta.  The event founded by Grambling State University alumni and NFL greats Doug Williams and James Harris, honors extraordinary football players who played at historically black institutions.

The annual Bronner Bros. International Beauty Show is the largest in the world that primarily focuses on black women beauty.

The annual Taliah Waajid World Natural Hair Show bills itself as the world's largest natural black hair show and conference.

The Curl, Kinks, and Culture (CKC) Festival held annually in Atlanta is an event focused on celebrating natural black hairstyles and culture.

Atlanta has been deemed America's "Black Soccer Capital" due to the emerging presence of black Atlantans supporting the city's MLS team Atlanta United.

Escape The Trap is the only trap music themed escape room in the U.S.  At the same location, the Trap Museum is also a popular destination, especially among teenagers and young adults.

Magic City is one of the oldest and most well-known black-owned gentlemen's clubs in the U.S.

Atlanta is the host city for the annual Honda Battle of the Bands.  The event showcases several HBCU marching bands and celebrity music artists in front of 50,000+ spectators and fans.  It is the largest and most popular collegiate marching band event in the country.

Atlanta Black Expo is an annual event that focuses on networking and empowering black entrepreneurs.

Atlanta has one of the highest numbers of independent black owned bookstores and is listed as one of the top destinations for readers of African-American literature.

The annual Spelman College-Morehouse College joint homecoming week better known as "SpelHouse Homecoming" attracts over 30,000 of alumni and visitors.  Clark Atlanta's annual homecoming week also attracts thousands of alumni and visitors to Atlanta.

The Atlanta Black Pride celebration is the largest in the world for black LGBT people.  The event attracts over 100,000 participants and has a major economic impact on the city.  Atlanta has one of the highest concentrations of black, openly LGBT people in the world.

Museums

Only New York City rivals Atlanta in the number of museums about black history, art and cultural heritage. The King Historic Site and APEX Museum are in the Sweet Auburn area just east of Downtown: John Wesley Dobbs called "Sweet" Auburn Avenue "the richest Negro street in the world" in the early 20th century. Most other African American museums are within walking distance of each other on the Atlanta University Center campus or in nearby West End, a neighborhood of Victorian houses which has become the center of the Afrocentric movement in Atlanta.

 The Martin Luther King Jr. National Historical Park includes a museum chronicling the Civil Rights Movement, the preserved boyhood home of Dr. King, the church where he pastored, and his final resting place
 Herndon Home - the mansion of Alonzo Franklin Herndon, a rags-to-riches hero who was born into slavery, but went on to become Atlanta's first black millionaire
 Hammonds House Museum of African American fine art. Located in a historic Queen Anne-style house; celebrates the culture of the African diaspora, West End
 Zucot Gallery is the largest black owned art gallery in the Southeast U.S.
 Spelman College Museum of Fine Art on the Spelman College campus, specializing in art by and about women of the African diaspora
 The Art Museum at Clark Atlanta University emphasizes art by people of the African diaspora
 Omenala Griot Afrocentric Teaching Museum is located in the West End
 Old Zion Baptist Church Heritage Museum preserving the history, art and culture of the black community in Cobb County
The Madame CJ Walker Museum, an original Madame CJ Walker Beauty Shoppe
The Trap Museum displays aspects and historic moments of Trap music culture
The National Center for Civil and Human Rights is in Pemberton Place adjacent to Centennial Olympic Park.

History

Antebellum

Slavery in the state of Georgia mostly constituted the main reason for early African American residency in the Atlanta area. The area that included Decatur was opened to settlement in 1823 following the forced abandonment of the area by the Cherokee Nation; with the ceding of the area under the Treaty of New Echota in 1835, plantations of rice and, later, cotton were installed in the area. Most slaves were brought from major ports such as Savannah and Charleston.

In 1850, the area which would become Atlanta, previously known as Terminus and Marthasville, had a population which included 493 African slaves, 18 free blacks, and 2,058 whites. The general population of the area had only recently skyrocketed from a mere total of 30 residents in 1842 due to the building of two Georgia Railroad freight and passenger trains (1845) and the Macon & Western (1846, a third railroad) which connected the little settlement with Macon and Savannah. In the 1850s, Mary Combs and Ransom Montgomery became the first two African-Americans to own property in Atlanta.

Civil War and Reconstruction
African slaves in the Atlanta area became divided in their loyalties to the then-current status quo as the American Civil War took place between the Confederacy, of which Georgia was a constituent member, and the Union states; the slavery regime also became harsher against both slave and free Africans, who were severely restricted in their movements by both local and state government in order to prevent desertion of the Africans to the Union side. However, many slaves from Atlanta took the chance to escape with Union soldiers under William Tecumseh Sherman in his March to the Sea following the razing of Atlanta to the ground; they followed his men to the Atlantic coast of Georgia, where they were granted land under Sherman's Special Field Orders, No. 15 (later rescinded under president Andrew Johnson).

In 1865, the Atlanta City Council vowed equal protection for whites and blacks, and a school for black children, the first in the city, opened in an old church building on Armstrong Street. The Methodist Episcopal Church's Freedman Aid Society founded a coeducational school for African American legislators that would later become Clark College (now Clark Atlanta University) in Atlanta. In 1870, following the ratification of the 15th Amendment by the state legislature, the first two African American members, George Graham and William Finch, were elected to the City Council from the third and fourth wards respectively, while Radical Republican Dennis Hammond sat as mayor.

According to the US Census and Slave Schedules, from 1860 to 1870 Fulton County more than doubled in population, from 14,427 to 33,336. The effects of African-American migration can be seen by the increase in Fulton County from 20.5% enslaved African Americans in 1860 to 45.7% colored (African-American) residents in 1870. In a pattern seen across the South after the Civil War, freedmen often moved from plantations to towns or cities for work. They also gathered in their own communities where they could live more freely from white control. Even if they continued to work as farm laborers, freedmen often migrated after the war. Fulton was one of several counties in Georgia where African American population increased significantly in those years.

Post-Reconstruction and Jim Crow
In the aftermath of Reconstruction, which mostly ended in 1877, African Americans in Atlanta were left to the mercies of the predominantly white state legislature and city council, and were politically disenfranchised during the Jim Crow era; whites had used a variety of tactics, including militias and legislation, to re-establish political and social supremacy throughout the South. By the turn of the century, Georgia passed legislation that completed the disenfranchisement of African Americans.  Not even college-educated men could vote. However, while most black Atlantans were poor and disenfranchised by Jim Crow, the gradual nationwide rise of the black urban middle class became apparent in Atlanta, with the establishment of African American businesses, media and educational institutions.

Booker T. Washington, principal of the Tuskegee Institute in Alabama, delivered a speech to the 1895 Cotton States and International Exposition which urged African Americans to focus more upon economic empowerment instead of immediate socio-political empowerment and rights, much to the anger of other civil rights leaders, including W. E. B. Du Bois, a graduate of Fisk University and Harvard, who would become one of the major civil rights activists of the first half of the 20th century.

Competition for jobs and housing gave rise to fears and tensions. These catalyzed in 1906 in the Atlanta Race Riot. This left at least 28 dead, 25 of them African American, and over seventy people injured. Neighborhoods became more segregated as Blacks sought safety in majority-Black areas such as Sweet Auburn and areas west of Downtown. As racial tensions rose, particularly resentment from working-class whites against better-off Blacks, segregation was introduced into more areas of public life. For example, Atlanta's streetcars were officially segregated in 1910, with Blacks forced to sit at the rear.

In 1928, the Atlanta Daily World began publication, and continues as one of the oldest African American newspaper in circulation. From the 1920s to the 1940s, the Atlanta Black Crackers, a baseball team in the Negro Southern League, and later on, in the Negro American League, entertained sports fans at Ponce de Leon Park; some of the members of the Black Crackers would become players in Major League Baseball following the integration of the Negro leagues into the larger leagues. Sweet Auburn would become one of the premier predominantly African American urban settlements to the current day.

Civil Rights Movement
Since the rise of the civil rights movement, African Americans have wielded an increasingly potent degree of political power, most resultant in the currently unbroken string of African American mayors of the City of Atlanta since the election of Maynard Jackson in 1973; the current mayor of Atlanta is Keisha Lance Bottoms.  In addition, Atlanta's city council has long been majority black. All elected mayors of Atlanta are and have been members of the Democratic Party.

In 2008, Atlanta area resident Vernon Jones ran unsuccessfully to become the first African American to win the Democratic primary for representation of the state in the United States Senate.

In May 2018, Atlanta area resident and Spelman College alumna Stacey Abrams became the first black woman to win a major party nomination for governor in the United States.  In November, she lost the controversial 2018 Georgia gubernatorial election by less than three percentage points.  Due to the election being so close, Abrams committed to running for office again. In February 2019, Stacey Abrams became the first black woman to give an official State of the Union address.

In January 2021, Atlanta area resident and Morehouse College alumnus Raphael Warnock became the first black U.S. senator elected in Georgia and the first black U.S. Democratic senator elected in the South.

Gentrification

Since 2010, gentrification has changed many aspects of Atlanta hence why it has been a popular topic.  Gentrification of working and middle class predominately African-American neighborhoods, particularly those in close proximity to Downtown Atlanta or the BeltLine, raised housing costs within the city limits which prompted many African Americans to move to surrounding suburbs seeking a more affordable cost of living.  The African American resident percentage in Atlanta dropped significantly, while the non-African American resident percentage increased significantly. The fastest growth of African Americans are in the suburbs of Atlanta.  The mayoral office of Atlanta is actively working on adding and maintaining affordable housing in the city to help keep Atlanta as diverse as possible.

Notable people
Playboi Carti
Martin Luther King Jr.
Lil Nas X
Chris Tucker
Spike Lee
Gladys Knight

See also
Atlanta Exposition Speech
Atlanta Student Movement
Atlanta Voice
Cascade Heights
Collier Heights
List of African-American newspapers in Georgia
100 Black Men of America
National Coalition of 100 Black Women
Tyler Perry Studios
Music in Atlanta
Freaknik
Demographics of Atlanta
Hispanic and Latino communities in Metro Atlanta
History of the Jews in Atlanta
Atlanta Black Pride
1906 Atlanta race riot
George Floyd protests in Atlanta
National Black Arts Festival
Atlanta murders of 1979–1981
Racial segregation in Atlanta
Mexicans in Atlanta
History of Atlanta

References

Further reading
 Bacote, Clarence A. "The Negro in Atlanta politics." Phylon 16.4 (1955): 333-350.
 Carter, Rev. Edward R. The Black Side: a partial history of the business, religious, and educational side of the Negro in Atlanta, Ga. (1894)
 Dorsey, Allison. To build our lives together: Community formation in black Atlanta, 1875-1906 (University of Georgia Press, 2004) online.
 Ferguson, Karen Jane. Black politics in New Deal Atlanta (Univ of North Carolina Press, 2002).
 Grady-Willis, Winston A. Challenging US apartheid: Atlanta and black struggles for human rights, 1960-1977 (Duke University Press, 2006). online
 Hobson, Maurice J. The legend of the Black mecca: Politics and class in the making of modern Atlanta (UNC Press Books, 2017).
 Hornsby, Alton. “Black Public Education in Atlanta, Georgia, 1954-1973: From Segregation to Segregation.” Journal of Negro History 76#1 (1991), pp. 21–47. online
 Meier, August, and David Lewis. "History of the Negro upper class in Atlanta, Georgia, 1890-1958." Journal of Negro Education 28.2 (1959): 128-139. online
 Merritt, Carole.  "African Americans in Atlanta: Community Building in a New South City," Southern Spaces, March 2004.
 Plank, David N., and Marcia Turner. "Changing patterns in Black school politics: Atlanta, 1872-1973." American Journal of Education 95.4 (1987): 584-608.

External links
 National Park Service - African American experience in Atlanta
 Atlanta History Timeline

 
Demographics of Atlanta
Atlanta
Atlanta
Ethnic groups in Atlanta
African-American culture